Spanish Ranch is an unincorporated community in Plumas County, California. It lies at an elevation of 3668 feet (1118 m). Spanish Ranch is located north- northeast of Meadow Valley.

The place was established by two Mexicans in 1850, and it developed into a distribution center for the numerous mining camps nearby. The Spanish Ranch post office operated from 1861 to 1913. The site is now registered as California Historical Landmark #481.

References

Mexican-American culture in California
Unincorporated communities in California
Unincorporated communities in Plumas County, California
Populated places established in 1850
1850 establishments in California